The Grand Prix of Minnesota was an auto racing event held from 1996 until 1998 on an Alan Wilson-designed temporary street circuit in Minneapolis, Minnesota near the Hubert H. Humphrey Metrodome. It was known as the Children's Grand Prix of Minneapolis in 1996, changing its name to The Sprint PCS Grand Prix of Minneapolis for its final two years.  

The Grand Prix of Minneapolis was started as the first professional auto race in the United States that would contribute all of its profit to charity. The goal of the Grand Prix was to make a $1 million annual contribution to the Cancer KIDS Fund, part of the Children's Healthcare Foundation of the Twin Cities.  The event was founded by Mark and Claudia Cohn after their son Tyler (1988 – 1997) was diagnosed with leukemia at the age of 4.  Rather than giving a one-time donation, the Cohn's decided to create an event that would provide long-term support for the Cancer KIDS Fund.

The event debuted on July 6 and 7 1996 with Boston Market as the sponsor. They returned for their second year on July 4 through 6 1997 with Sprint PCS as its sponsor, and they held an event on June 27 and 28 1998 with Sprint PCS continuing to be their sponsor.

All three years had the Sports Car Club of America (SCCA) Trans-Am Championship as the featured race. The supporting races in 1996 included the World Challenge Grand Sports Division, Sports 2 and Touring Division, Touring 1 and 2, Spec Racer Ford Pro Series, and a Vintage Car race. The supporting races in 1997 were the Barber Dodge Pro Series, World Challenge Touring Division 1 and 2, Spec Racer Ford Pro Series, and a Vintage Car race. For their last year, the supporting races were the United States Road Racing Championship, F2000 Series, World Challenge Touring Division 1 and 2, and the Dodge Neon Charity Challenge.

Race winners
Trans-Am

USRRC

SCCA World Challenge S2 Class

SCCA World Challenge T1 Class

SCCA World Challenge T2 Class

SCCA Spec Racer Ford

Barber Dodge Pro Series

U.S. F2000 National Championship

Vintage

External links
 Cancer Kids Fund
Sports Car Club of America Website
Wilson Motorsport Track Map

Sources
 Deborah Hopp, Publisher, Children's Grand Prix of Minnesota 1996 Official Souvenir Program, MSP Communications Custom Publishing
 Deborah Hopp, Publisher, Sprint PCS Grand Prix of Minnesota 1997 Official Souvenir Program, MSP Communications Custom Publishing
 Deborah Hopp, Publisher, Sprint PCS Grand Prix of Minnesota 1998 Official Souvenir Program, MSP Communications Custom Publishing
 http://wilsonmotorsport.com/public_html/code/maps.htm#street
 http://motorsport.com/news/article.asp?ID=5884&FS=TRANSAM
 http://motorsport.com/news/article.asp?ID=5885&FS=TRANSAM
 http://motorsport.com/news/article.asp?ID=10231&FS=TRANSAM
 http://motorsport.com/news/article.asp?ID=10233&FS=TRANSAM
 http://motorsport.com/news/article.asp?ID=17002&FS=TRANSAM
 http://motorsport.com/news/article.asp?ID=17146&FS=TRANSAM

Sports car races
Auto races in the United States

Recurring sporting events established in 1996
Recurring events disestablished in 1998
Motorsport in Minnesota